is a Japanese conditioning coach for the Chunichi Dragons in Japan's Nippon Professional Baseball.

Career
Tsuakamoto is a graduate of Seibudaichiba High School and Osaka University of Health and Sport Sciences.

Following graduation from university, Tsukamoto worked with Matsushita Electronics Baseball Club (Now Panasonic) as conditioning coach for 5 years.

At university, he was a trainer for Koji Uehara.

Tsukamoto was brought to the Nippon Professional Baseball club, the Chunichi Dragons by then second team coach, Kenichiro Kawamura where he has been employed as conditioning coach since 2003.

References

External links
 Dragons.jp (Japanese)

1975 births
Living people
People from Saitama Prefecture
Japanese baseball coaches
Nippon Professional Baseball coaches